Goya is a genus of snout moths. It was described by Émile Louis Ragonot in 1888.

Species
 Goya albivenella Ragonot, 1888
 Goya ovaliger (A. Blanchard, 1975)
 Goya simulata J. C. Shaffer, 1989
 Goya stictella (Hampson, 1918)

References

Anerastiini
Pyralidae genera
Taxa named by Émile Louis Ragonot